The 2018-19 Botswana First Division South was the 54th season of the Botswana First Division South since its inception in 1966. It was played from August to May. Gilport Lions were crowned champions.

Team summaries

Teams promoted from Botswana Division One
 Holy Ghost
 Ncojane Young Stars
Teams relegated from Botswana Premier League
Sankoyo Bush Bucks
Mochudi Centre Chiefs
Black Forest
Teams promoted to Botswana Premier League
Gilport Lions
Teams relegated to Botswana Division One
 Black Rangers
 Modipane United
 Blue Stars
Stadiums and locations

League table

Football in Botswana